A Feast at Midnight is a 1994 British comedy family film directed by Justin Hardy and starring Christopher Lee, Freddie Findlay, Robert Hardy, Samuel West, Edward Fox and Julie Dreyfus. The film is notable for being the feature film debut of future Conservative politician Michael Gove, as the chaplain.

Plot
Dryden Park, a prep school, welcomes a new boy, Magnus (Freddie Findlay) whose father is convalescing in Paris. Magnus is immediately targeted by bullies and gets no support from his housemaster, Professor "Raptor" (Christopher Lee).
Magnus seeks solace in letters from his father (Edward Fox), with whom he shares a love of good food, but the school follows a strict diet, so Magnus organizes his new friends into a secret society who enjoy midnight feasting.  Magnus and other boys also being bullied go to the school kitchen after lights out, where Magnus cooks and serves a midnight feast made up of delicious snacks.
As the Midnight Feast Society grows under the nose of the housemaster, the bullies continue to dislike Magnus and his friends and set out to cause trouble for all those who are part of the Midnight Feast.

Cast
  Christopher Lee - V. E. 'Raptor' Longfellow  
  Robert Hardy - Headmaster  
  Edward Fox - Father  
  Freddie Findlay - Magnus 
  Stuart Hawley - Bathurst
  Aled Roberts - Goff  
  Andrew Lusher - Tava  
  Samuel West - Chef  
  Carol MacReady - Miss Plunder  
  Lisa Faulkner - Miss Charlotte  
  Julie Dreyfus - Mother
  Michael Gove - Chaplain
  Brian Cant - Mr. Hill
  Sebastian Armesto - Oberoi
  Mathew Blakiston  - Merriman

Release
The film was shown at the London Film Festival in November 1994.

Reception
Empire said of the film: "Nothing about it suggests that it should have been made for the big screen, so modest is its scope."

References

External links
 

1995 films
1995 drama films
British drama films
Films scored by John Murphy (composer)
Films directed by Justin Hardy
Films set in schools
Films set in boarding schools
Cooking films
1990s high school films
1990s English-language films
1990s British films